Isara (minor planet designation: 364 Isara) is a stony Florian asteroid from the inner regions of the asteroid belt, approximately 27 kilometers in diameter. It was discovered on 19 March 1893, by French astronomer Auguste Charlois at the Nice Observatory in southeast France. The asteroid was named after the Isère River in France.

Orbit and classification 

Isara is a member of the Flora family, a giant asteroid family and the largest family of stony asteroids in the main-belt.

It orbits the Sun in the inner main-belt at a distance of 1.9–2.6 AU once every 3 years and 4 months (1,209 days). Its orbit has an eccentricity of 0.15 and an inclination of 6° with respect to the ecliptic. The body's observation arc begins at Vienna Observatory in April 1900, seven years after to its official discovery observation at Nice.

Physical characteristics 

In the Tholen classification, Isara is a common stony S-type asteroid, which agrees with the overall spectral type of the Flora family.

Rotation period 

In 2009, photometric observations of Isara were made by American astronomer Brian Warner at the Palmer Divide Observatory in Colorado, by amateur astronomer René Roy at Blauvac Observatory in France, and by a group of Polish astronomers led by Agnieszka Kryszczyńska of the Polish Astronomical Society. The resulting asymmetrical lightcurves showed a synodic rotation period between 9.151 and 9.157 hours with a brightness variation between 0.30 and 0.40 in magnitude.

The results agree with the first rotational lightcurve was already obtained in the 1960s.

Spin axis 

In 2013, an international study modeled a lightcurve with a concurring period of 9.15751 hours and found two spin axis of (282.0°, 44.0°) and (86.0°, 42.0°) in ecliptic coordinates (λ, β).

Diameter and albedo 

According to the surveys carried out by the Infrared Astronomical Satellite IRAS, the Japanese Akari satellite and the NEOWISE mission of NASA's Wide-field Infrared Survey Explorer, Isara measures between 25.901 and 35.209 kilometers in diameter and its surface has an albedo between 0.1625 and 0.300.

The Collaborative Asteroid Lightcurve Link adopt the results obtained by IRAS, that is, an albedo of 0.2566 and a diameter of 27.99 kilometers based on an absolute magnitude of 9.86.

Naming 

This minor planet was named after the Isère River in south eastern France. ("Isara" is an early name for this river.) The official naming citation was mentioned in The Names of the Minor Planets by Paul Herget in 1955.

Notes

References

External links 
 Asteroid Lightcurve Database (LCDB), query form (info )
 Dictionary of Minor Planet Names, Google books
 Asteroids and comets rotation curves, CdR – Observatoire de Genève, Raoul Behrend
 Discovery Circumstances: Numbered Minor Planets (1)-(5000) – Minor Planet Center
 
 

000364
Discoveries by Auguste Charlois
Named minor planets
000364
18930319